Marc Ponthus pioneered the monographic solo piano recital of leading avant-garde composers from the second half of the 20th century, devoting entire programs to Pierre Boulez, Karlheinz Stockhausen, Iannis Xenakis and others. He has performed extensively in North America and abroad in London, Paris, Berlin, Moscow, Beijing and featured in many contemporary music festivals. Ponthus has recorded for Neuma Records, Lorelt Records and Bridge Records.  His recording of the complete piano music of Pierre Boulez released in 2016 was chosen Editor's Choice by Gramophone Magazine.
Ponthus has conducted the LowerEastsideEnsemble, the IFCP Ensemble and the Project Webern Orchestra in addition to staging and directing contemporary chamber operas. Ponthus is the founder and director of the Institute and Festival for Contemporary Performance in New York.

A recipient of the Tanne Foundation Award for achievement in the arts, he incorporates video collage in live performances.  He has written and directed experimental short films which have been chosen official selections at international festivals (NewFilmMakers New York, IndyFest Film Awards, Revelation Perth Int Film Festival, Northeast Int Film Festival).

His performances have been reviewed by The New York Times.

In addition to his artistic endeavors, Ponthus has been involved in humanitarian issues, writing for the London newspaper The Independent about his experiences in war-torn Sarajevo.

References

 Boston Globe/Richard Dyer/March 5, 1993  Marc Ponthus Masters Boulez for a Brilliant Debut
 New York Times/Allan Kozinn/June 17, 2004 In Summertime Enrichment, the new and familiar mix - IFCP concert
 Boston Globe/Richard Dyer/May 22, 1996 - From Bosnia to Boston - A musical escape inspired  by concerts under fire, oboist plays her way to New England Conservatory
 Boston Globe/Richard Dyer/Feb 12 1995 Marc Ponthus - An Artist who "shows up"
 New York Times/April 1, 1994/Edward Rothstein All Stockhausen concert - Coaxing out the music that's hiding in the chaos
 Xenakis: Complete Music for Piano; Ravel: Gaspard de la Nuit - Marc Ponthus | Songs, Reviews, Credits | AllMusic

20th-century French male classical pianists
21st-century French male classical pianists
Prize-winners of the Paloma O'Shea International Piano Competition
Living people
Year of birth missing (living people)